Kime is a surname. Notable people with the surname include:

Geoff Kime (born 1958), English-born Australian darts player
Haddon Kime (born 1976), American theatre and film composer, lyricist, sound designer, and director
Hal Kime (1898–1939), American baseball player
J. William Kime (1934–2006), United States Coast Guard admiral
Jamie Kime, American guitarist
Karen Kime, Aboriginal Australian priest and archdeacon

See also
Kimes